Johannes Hendrik (Hans) Gispen (1905 – 1968) was a Dutch politician. Before he entered politics he was a director of Organon.

References
  Parlement.com biography

1905 births
1968 deaths
Anti-Revolutionary Party politicians
20th-century Dutch businesspeople
Dutch civil servants
20th-century Dutch economists
Dutch people of World War II
Erasmus University Rotterdam alumni
Knights of the Order of the Netherlands Lion
Ministers of Agriculture of the Netherlands
Ministers of Economic Affairs of the Netherlands
People from Baarn